HMS Chatham was a  light cruiser built for the Royal Navy in the 1910s. She was the name ship of her sub-class of the Town class. The ship survived the First World War and was sold for scrap in 1926.

Design and description
The Chatham sub-class were slightly larger and improved versions of the preceding Weymouth sub-class.

The main armament of the Chathams was eight BL 6-inch (152 mm) Mk XI guns. Two of these guns were mounted on the centreline fore and aft of the superstructure and two more were mounted on the forecastle deck abreast the bridge. The remaining four guns amidships were raised to the extended forecastle deck, which meant that they could be worked in all weathers. All these guns were fitted with gun shields. Four Vickers 3-pounder (47 mm) saluting guns were also fitted. The armament was completed by two submerged 21-inch (533 mm) torpedo tubes.

Construction and career
The ship was laid down on 3 January 1911 by Chatham Royal Dockyard and launched on 6 November. Upon completion in December 1912, Chatham was assigned to the 2nd Battle Squadron and was transferred to the 2nd Light Cruiser Squadron in the Mediterranean in July 1913.

Chatham remained part of the Mediterranean Fleet at the outbreak of the First World War, and was initially employed in the search for the German battlecruiser  and cruiser , searching the Straits of Messina on 3 August. After the two German ships avoided the British forces and reached Turkey, Chatham was detached for operations in the Red Sea on 13 August 1914.

On 20 September that year, the German light cruiser  sank the old British cruiser  in Zanzibar harbour. Chatham arrived at Zanzibar on 28 September, but her participation in the search was delayed when she ran aground off that port on 1 October. While Chatham was only lightly damaged, she was under repair at Mombasa from 3 October to 15 October

On 19 October Chatham s boats found the German steamer Präsident  upriver from the coastal town of Lindi, German East Africa (now Tanzania). While the Germans claimed that Präsident was a hospital ship, the British found no medical equipment on board and had not been notified of the German ship's status and found documents aboard Präsident indicating that she had acted as a supply ship for Königsberg. The German ship was claimed as a Prize of war, but as Präsidents engines were broken down, Chatham permanently disabled Präsidents machinery before continuing the search for Königsberg.

On 30 October Chatham found Königsberg and the supply ship Somali up the Rufiji River, but owing to the shallowness of the river delta, could not closely approach the two German ships. On 7 November Chatham hit Somali with a shell, causing a fire that destroyed the supply ship, while on 10 November the British scuttled the collier Newbridge in the main channel of the Delta, blocking Königsberg from escaping to sea.  Chatham left East African waters on 2 January 1915 for the Mediterranean.

From May 1915 Chatham supported the Allied landings at Gallipoli. On 12–13 July 1915 she provided gunfire support to an attack along the Achi Baba Nullah dry water course on Cape Helles, and on 6–7 August took part in the Landing at Suvla Bay, acting as the flagship of Rear-Admiral John de Robeck, in command of Naval Forces during the operation. On 20 December Chatham acted as the flagship for Admiral Weymss during the evacuation from Sulva Bay and Anzac Cove.

In 1916 she returned to home waters and joined the 3rd Light Cruiser Squadron of the Grand Fleet. On 26 May 1916, Chatham struck a mine off the Norfolk coast and had to be towed to Chatham for repairs. The ship was placed in reserve in 1918. After the war, Chatham was lent to the New Zealand Division of the Royal Navy from 1920 to 1924, During late June 1921, she carried out a search for the missing steamer SS Canastota.

She was sold for scrapping on 13 July 1926 to Thos. W. Ward, of Pembroke Dock.

In 1922, the crew of Chatham donated a cup to the New Zealand Football Association. This became the Chatham Cup, New Zealand's local equivalent of the FA Cup, and its premier knockout football trophy.

Notes

Bibliography

External links

 Ships of the Chatham group

Town-class cruisers (1910) of the Royal Navy
Ships built in Chatham
1911 ships
World War I cruisers of the United Kingdom